The Diocese of Syene is an ancient see of the Coptic Church in Aswan, Egypt. As its first bishop Neilammon was not mentioned as a new one in the Festal Letter of 339, it is assumed the diocese was established in the early 330s. Appion referred to himself as the "Bishop of the Legions of Syene, Contra Syene, and Elephantine," indicating an affiliation with the border guards at Aswan, but this may have been an error for "region."

The current bishop is Hedra, Metropolitan of Aswan (Syene and Elephantine) and Kom Ombo.

Bishops of Syene
Neilammon I, died 346
Neilammon II, 346-356 (banished to the Siwa Oasis by Arian archbishop George of Cappadocia
Unknown?
Saint Hatre, c. 385-412 (Saint's Day: 12 Choiak)
Unknown?
Appion, 425-450
Unknown?
Valerius
Ammonius, c. 460
Macrinus
Unknown?
Iosephios, 5th or 6th century
Hedra, current

References
Dijkstra, J. Harm F.: Religious encounters on the southern Egyptian frontier in Late Antiquity (AD 298-642).

Aswan
Coptic Orthodox bishops
Coptic Orthodox Church